The 2001–02 National Division One (known as the Jewson National Division One for sponsorship reasons) was the 15th full season of rugby union within the second tier of the English league system, currently known as the RFU Championship. New teams to the division included Rotherham who had been relegated from the Zurich Premiership 2000–01 while Bracknell and Rugby Lions had been promoted from the 2000–01 National Division Two.

For the first time the team finishing first, Rotherham,  were denied promotion to the Zurich Premiership for season 2002–03 because their ground was not of the required standard - this was the first time a team had been denied entry to the top flight of English rugby since the leagues started in 1987 due to the introduction of the controversial 'minimum standards' rule for clubs seeking to join the Premiership.  Worcester were runners-up for the second consecutive season, and Henley Hawks and Bracknell were relegated to the 2002–03 National Division Two with Bracknell spending just one season in the division.

Participating teams

Table

Results

Round 1

Round 2

Round 3

Round 4

Round 5

Round 6

Round 7

Round 8 

Postponed.  Rescheduled for 24 November 2001.

Postponed.  Rescheduled for 16 February 2002.

Postponed.  Rescheduled for 15 December 2001.

Postponed.  Rescheduled for 15 February 2002.

Round 9

Round 10

Round 8 (rescheduled game) 

Game rescheduled from 27 October 2001.

Round 11

Round 12

Round 8 (rescheduled game) 

Game rescheduled from 27 October 2001.

Round 13

Round 14 

Game rescheduled to 2 March 2002.

Game rescheduled to 2 March 2002.

Game rescheduled to 17 February 2002.

Game rescheduled to 2 March 2002.

Game rescheduled to 16 February 2002.

Game rescheduled to 2 March 2002.

Game rescheduled to 2 March 2002.

Round 15

Round 16

Round 17 

Postponed.  Game rescheduled to 23 March 2002.

Round 18

Round 19 

Postponed.  Game rescheduled to 23 March 2002.

Rounds 8 & 14 (rescheduled games) 

Game rescheduled from 27 October 2001.

Game rescheduled from 27 October 2001.

Game rescheduled from 5 January 2002.

Game rescheduled from 5 January 2002.

Round 20

Round 14 (rescheduled games) 

Game rescheduled from 5 January 2002.

Game rescheduled from 5 January 2002.

Game rescheduled from 5 January 2002.

Game rescheduled from 5 January 2002.

Game rescheduled from 5 January 2002.

Round 21

Round 22

Round 17 & 19 (rescheduled games) 

Game rescheduled from 26 January 2002.

Game rescheduled from 9 February 2002.

Round 23

Round 24

Round 25

Round 26

Total season attendances

Individual statistics
 Note that points scorers includes tries as well as conversions, penalties and drop goals.

Top points scorers

Top try scorers

Season records

Team
Largest home win — 73 pts
73 - 0 Rotherham at home to Birmingham & Solihull on 13 April 2002
Largest away win — 65 pts
72 - 7 Rotherham away to Manchester on 6 April 2002
Most points scored — 73 pts
73 - 0 Rotherham at home to Birmingham & Solihull on 13 April 2002
Most tries in a match — 12
Rotherham away to Manchester on 6 April 2002
Most conversions in a match — 9
Worcester at home to Henley Hawks on 19 January 2002
Most penalties in a match — 9
Manchester at home to Wakefield on 15 December 2001
Most drop goals in a match — 3
Exeter Chiefs away to Rotherham on 10 November 2001

Player
Most points in a match — 32
 Sateki Tuipulotu for Worcester at home to Henley Hawks on 19 January 2002
Most tries in a match — 5 (x2)
 Chris Garrard for Worcester at home to Otley on 9 March 2002
 Michael Wood for Rotherham at home to Birmingham & Solihull on 13 April 2002
Most conversions in a match — 8 (x2)
 Tony Yapp for Worcester at home to Henley Hawks on 19 January 2002
 Link Wilfley for Rotherham at home to Moseley on 30 March 2002
Most penalties in a match —  9
 Marcus Barrow for Manchester at home to Wakefield on 15 December 2001
Most drop goals in a match —  3
 Chris Malone for Exeter Chiefs away to Rotherham on 10 November 2001

Attendances

Highest — 4,800 
Worcester at home to Rotherham on 22 September 2001
Lowest — 150 (x2) 
Bracknell at home to Exeter Chiefs on 2 March 2002
Moseley at home to Rugby Lions on 23 March 2002
Highest Average Attendance — 2,376
Worcester
Lowest Average Attendance — 369	
Wakefield

See also
 English rugby union system

References

2001–02 in English rugby union leagues
2001-02